Michael Jordan (born January 25, 1998) is an American football offensive guard for the Carolina Panthers of the National Football League (NFL). He played college football at Ohio State and was drafted by the Cincinnati Bengals in the fourth round of the 2019 NFL Draft.

Professional career

Cincinnati Bengals
Jordan was drafted by the Cincinnati Bengals in the fourth round, 136th overall, of the 2019 NFL Draft. He started nine games at left guard as a rookie, then 10 games there in 2020.

On August 31, 2021, Jordan was waived by the Bengals.

Carolina Panthers
On September 1, 2021, Jordan was claimed off waivers by the Carolina Panthers. On October 4, 2021, Jordan was waived by the Panthers and re-signed to the practice squad. He was promoted to the active roster on October 16, 2021.

In the final game of the 2022 season, Jordan recovered a Sam Darnold fumble in the endzone for a game tying touchdown.

References

External links
Ohio State bio

1998 births
Living people
People from Canton, Michigan
Players of American football from Michigan
American football offensive linemen
Ohio State Buckeyes football players
Cincinnati Bengals players
Carolina Panthers players
African-American players of American football
21st-century African-American sportspeople